Li Gongzuo (Chinese: 李公佐; pinyin: Lǐ Gōngzuǒ; Wade-Giles: Li Kung-tso, c. 778–848) was a Chinese writer from Lanzhou during the Tang dynasty. He wrote The Governor of Nanke (南柯太守傳).

References

770s births
848 deaths
Tang dynasty writers